Mana Māori Motuhake was a Māori political party in New Zealand from 1980 to 2005. The name is difficult to translate accurately, but essentially refers to Māori self-rule and self-determination — , in this context, can be understood as "authority" or "power", while  can be understood as "independent" or "separate". The purpose of the party was to unify Māori to gain 'political potency'. From 1991 to 2002, the party participated in the left-wing Alliance.

History

Early years
Mana Motuhake was formed in 1980 by Matiu Rata, a former Labour Party member of parliament who had served as Minister of Māori Affairs in the third Labour government (1972–1975). Rata had grown increasingly dissatisfied with Labour Party policy. Eventually deciding that Māori needed an independent voice, he announced his intention to resign from Labour on 6 November 1979. He announced that he would promote a movement based on "mana Māori motuhake". At Easter 1980, he launched the Mana Motuhake party, and resigned his seat in Parliament to contest a by-election under its banner. In the resulting Northern Maori by-election of 1980, Rata was defeated by the Labour Party's new candidate, Bruce Gregory.

Mana Motuhake stood candidates in the 1981, 1984, 1987, and 1990 general elections, but was unsuccessful on each occasion.

In 1991 Mana Motuhake formed a new party called the Alliance by joining with three other political parties NewLabour Party, the Green Party, and the Democratic Party. Some in Mana Motuhake considered this move to take away the freedom of the party to speak up for Māori. There was a split and an independent Māori party led by Eva Rickard was founded called Mana Māori.

From the 1990s to deregistration

In the 1993 elections, a Mana Motuhake candidate, Sandra Lee, was elected to Parliament under the Alliance banner. When Rata retired the following year, Lee-Vercoe became Mana Motuhake's political leader. With the introduction of the MMP electoral system in the 1996 elections, Lee-Vercoe was joined in Parliament by Alamein Kopu. Kopu, however, eventually left the party, founding her own Mana Wahine Te Ira Tangata party. In the 1999 elections, another Mana Motuhake candidate, Willie Jackson, entered Parliament as an Alliance MP. In 2001, Jackson successfully challenged Lee-Vercoe for leadership of the party.

In 2002, when the Alliance split into moderate and radical factions, Mana Motuhake sided with the radicals, led by Laila Harré and Matt McCarten. Lee-Vercoe, the former leader, sided with Jim Anderton's moderate faction, but decided to retire from Parliament rather than stand for his breakaway Progressive Party. In the 2002 elections, the remnants of the Alliance were defeated, and Mana Motuhake was left without representation in Parliament. Shortly afterwards, it left the Alliance.

Mana Motuhake was deregistered in 2005.

Election results
The following table summarises the party's support in general elections:

Leaders
Mana motuhake, for discussion of the phrase
Matiu Rata (1980–1994)
Sandra Lee (1994–2001)
Willie Jackson (2001–2005)

References

Political parties established in 1980
Defunct political parties in New Zealand
Māori political parties in New Zealand
Political parties disestablished in 2005
1980 establishments in New Zealand
2005 disestablishments in New Zealand
Indigenous rights organizations